Detroit Harbor is a bay between the southern end of Washington Island, and the northern end of Detroit Island. It is located in Washington, Door County, Wisconsin. An unincorporated community also named Detroit Harbor is found on the northern side of the bay.  There are three islands inside of the bay, Snake Island, Big Susie Island, and Little Susie Island. The bay is dredged on either side to allow boats through, forming the East and West channels. Both car and passenger ferries to Washington Island go through Detroit Harbor, before they dock. The United States Coast Guard maintains operations in Detroit Harbor through the Washington Island Station. Detroit Harbor is designated as a Wisconsin state natural area by the Wisconsin Department of Natural Resources.

Climate

Gallery

References

Bays of Wisconsin
Bodies of water of Door County, Wisconsin
Bays of Lake Michigan